Leslie François Saint Roc Manigat (August 16, 1930 – June 27, 2014) was a Haitian politician who was elected as President of Haiti in a tightly controlled military held election in January 1988. He served as President for only a few months, from February 1988 to June 1988, before being ousted by the military in a coup d'état.

In education
Leslie Manigat was a professor at the prestigious l'Université de Paris-VIII Vincennes, where he gave courses on World History. He also published articles on education in various Haitian newspapers: Le Nouvelliste, La Phalange, and Le Matin.

1988 Haitian presidential elections
According to the Provisional Electoral Council (Conseil Electoral Provisoire, or CEP) he won the presidential election of January 17, 1988 with 50.29% of the votes, defeating ten other candidates. However, voter turnout was well under 10%. Few historians and vote monitors consider this election to have been democratic. He was inaugurated on February 7, 1988, and named Martial Célestin as his Prime Minister in March. He was overthrown by general Henri Namphy on June 20, 1988, in the June 1988 Haitian coup d'état. He ran for president again in the February 2006 election but was defeated, receiving 12.40% of the vote and placing a distant second behind René Préval.

Death
He died on June 27, 2014, at the age of 83.

Family

Manigat was born in Port-au-Prince. His second wife, Mirlande Manigat, whom he married in 1970, was a candidate in the 2010 presidential election.

Award
Leslie Manigat won The Haiti Grand Prize of literature 2004, given at the Miami Book Fair International of 2004. Nominees for the Prize were: Edwidge Danticat, René Depestre, Jean-Claude Fignolé, Odette Roy Fombrun, Frankétienne, Gary Klang, Dany Laferrière and Josaphat-Robert Large.

Selected works
Une date littéraire, un événement pédagogique - Essay, Port-au-Prince, 1962
L'Amérique latine au XXe Siècle - History, Université de Paris I Sorbonne, 1973

Sources

Further reading
Bibliographie des Etudes littéraires haïtiennes 1804-1984 (Bibliography of Haitian literary Studies) by Léon-François Hoffmann, EDICEF/AUPELF, Vanves, 1992

Editions Richelieu, Univers Contemporain, Paris, 1973
Jacques Nicolas Léger, Haiti: Her History and Her Detractors, 1907

External links
 Important Dates in Haïti's History

Presidents of Haiti
1930 births
2014 deaths
Rally of Progressive National Democrats politicians
1980s in Haiti
20th-century Haitian politicians